The following is a list of equipment currently in service with the Japan Ground Self-Defense Force.

Uniforms

Camouflage patterns 

 See also: List of military clothing camouflage patterns#Asia A–M

Other equipment

Rations 

Type I Combat Rations – Can-meshi (canned type ration packs)
Type II Combat Rations – Pack-meshi (boiled in bag type ration packs)
Survival Ration Pack – Emergency rations for aircrew, etc. Also used by ASDF & MSDF.
Training Rations – Commercial style perishable food/drink items used in exercises, on base, and when supplying civilians at PR events or during disaster relie.)
MCW/LRP ration – Japanese produced equivalent of the American ration.

Infantry weapons

Artillery and missile systems

Vehicles

Aircraft

Historic, retired or reserve equipment

Small arms

Personal equipment

Artillery and missile systems

Vehicles

Aircraft

References

Japan Ground Self-Defense Force
Military equipment of Japan
Japan
Equipment